The Virginian is a 1923 American silent Western film based upon the 1902 Owen Wister novel The Virginian and adapted from the popular 1904 theatrical play which Wister had collaborated on with playwright Kirke La Shelle. The film stars Kenneth Harlan as the Virginian and Russell Simpson as Trampas and was directed by Tom Forman. With the advent of talkies, the film was soon overshadowed by the 1929 motion picture The Virginian with Gary Cooper and Walter Huston.

Cast
 Kenneth Harlan as the Virginian
 Florence Vidor as Molly Woods
 Russell Simpson as Trampas
 Pat O'Malley as Steve
 Raymond Hatton as Shorty
 Milton Ross as Judge Henry
 Sam Allen as Uncle Hughey

References

External links
 Owen Wister Papers at the University of Wyoming – American Heritage Center
 
 

1923 films
Films based on American novels
Films based on Western (genre) novels
American black-and-white films
Films directed by Tom Forman
Films set in Wyoming
1923 Western (genre) films
Silent American Western (genre) films
Preferred Pictures films
1920s American films
1920s English-language films